Ternovsky (masculine), Ternovskaya (feminine), or Ternovskoye may refer to:
Ternovsky District, a district of Voronezh Oblast, Russia
Ternovsky (rural locality) (Ternovskaya, Ternovskoye), several rural localities in Russia